The Concerto for Two Flutes and Orchestra is a composition for two flutes and orchestra by the American composer Steven Stucky.  The work was commissioned by the Los Angeles Philharmonic, for which Stucky was formerly composer-in-residence and then New Music Adviser.  The piece was composed from October through December 1994 and was given its world premiere in Los Angeles by the Los Angeles Philharmonic under the conductor Esa-Pekka Salonen on February 23, 1995.

Composition

Structure
The concerto has a duration of roughly 20 minutes and is composed in three movements:
Elegy: Largo
Games: Allegro giocoso
Hymn: Adagio

Background
Stucky composed the concerto to feature the Los Angeles Philharmonic's principal flutists Janet Ferguson and Anne Diener Giles.  In the score program notes, he wrote, "I was attracted not only by their superb artistry, but also by the appealing sonic possibilities of two flutes; most of the time in this concerto the soloists play together, forming a kind of super-flute that affords richer textural and expressive resources than any single instrument."

The first movement is an elegy for Stucky's friend and fellow composer Witold Lutosławski, who died a few months prior to the work's composition.  Stucky described his intent, remarking, "the first movement is not so much an expression of grief as it is an homage to the beauty and greatness of spirit Lutoslawski's music embodies, and an attempt to honor him on his own terms by concentrating on the harmonic and melodic aspects of music that he held dear."

Conversely, Stucky described the second movement as "a scherzo in near-perpetual motion, whose materials (including lots of major and minor triads) are playful and sometimes quirky."

The final movement features two parallel musical lines: one emanating from the two soloists and the other coming from the orchestra.  The composer further described the movement, writing:
He concluded, "Why 'Hymn'? Partly because the technical structure of the music has something in common with certain medieval church music, but mostly because it expresses hope and praise—inspired in my case not by religious feelings, but by the pleasure of spending my life making music and the privilege of collaborating with great musicians."

Instrumentation
The work is scored for two flutes and an orchestra consisting of two oboes (2nd doubling cor anglais), two clarinets (1st doubling E-flat clarinet; 2nd doubling bass clarinet), two bassoons, two horns, two trumpets, trombone, timpani, two or three percussionists, piano (doubling celesta), harp, and strings.

Reception
Reviewing the world premiere, Timothy Mangan of the Los Angeles Times described the concerto as "an 18-minute work remarkable for elegant writing and a serious but altogether entertaining manner."  He continued:

References

Concertos by Steven Stucky
1994 compositions
Concertos for multiple instruments
Music commissioned by the Los Angeles Philharmonic